Fauve collective, sometimes stylized as FAUVE, is a French arts collective of music and videography established in 2010 in Paris. The band also uses the not equal to sign ≠. The act depends mostly on story telling through acting, through spoken word and musical accompaniment. The collective has its own record label called FAUVE CORP.

FAUVE presents itself as an open collective, containing at times more than twenty members (musicians, but also comedians, theatre technicians, visual artists). On stage, the collective is represented by five musicians (vocals, guitar, bass, drums and keyboards) and a video artist. During their media appearances, they aim to remain anonymous and of mysterious origins. The name of the band is inspired by Les Nuits fauves (English title Savage Nights), a 1992 French drama film directed and written by Cyril Collard.

The collective became known through its online postings and found almost immediate success. On 20 May 2013, the band released its debut EP BLIZZARD containing the best of their productions thus far. It made the French Top 20 in its first week of release and two of the tracks appeared in the French Singles Chart. During the Bourges Spring Festival, it won the iNOUïS award as the discovery act of the festival called Découvertes du Printemps.

The collective's first album is called VIEUX FRÈRES - Partie 1. The album was released in two parts: VIEUX FRÈRES - Partie 1 was released on 2 February 2014 reaching number 2 in the SNEP French charts. The second part VIEUX FRÈRES - Partie 2 was released on 16 February 2015.

Discography

Studio albums

Live albums

EPs

Singles

*Did not appear in the official Belgian Ultratop 50 charts, but rather in the bubbling under Ultratip charts.

References

External links
Official website

Musical groups from Paris
Musical collectives